Jorge Clemente may refer to:

 Jorge Clemente (actor) (born 1993), Spanish actor
 Jorge Clemente (boxer) (born 1946), Puerto Rican boxer